The House at 314 W. King Street was a single-family home located in Owosso, Michigan. It was listed on the National Register of Historic Places in 1980.

History

The House at 314 W. King Street was constructed in 1890, and reflects a time of growth in the city of Owosso. It was presumably demolished some time between 1980 and 2017.

Description
The House at 314 W. King Street was a two-story clapboard Queen Anne-style structure. It had
asymmetrical massing and fenestration, a varied roofline, and a broad porch typical of the Queen Anne style. The house had a wide variety of surfaces used on the facades, including tongue-and-groove on the entire base of the wood superstructure, clapboard on most of the facades, fish-scale shingling on the gables, vertical panelling on the underside of the overhanging eaves, and diamond carved wood lintels over the windows. On the front facade, there was a tri-sided bay, with a stained glass center window surrounded by decorative spandrels.

References

		
National Register of Historic Places in Shiawassee County, Michigan
Queen Anne architecture in Michigan
Houses completed in 1890